Andy Symanowski is a writer, director, animation director and stop-motion animator for Aardman Animations.

He was a key animator for the feature films Chicken Run, Wallace & Gromit: The Curse of the Were-Rabbit and The Pirates! In an Adventure with Scientists.

He was also an animator for several TV shows such as Rex the Runt, Creature Comforts, Angry Kid and Shaun The Sheep.

He served as a supervising animator on the Wallace & Gromit mini series, Cracking Contraptions.

He was also an assistant animator for the Pib and Pog shorts, the Angry Kid special and Flushed Away.

In April 2005, he also helped produce a film with children of Southville Primary.

References

External links
 Andy Symanowski Credits from the British Film Institute

Living people
British animators
Stop motion animators
British animated film producers
Year of birth missing (living people)